The Georgian S5 route (Georgian: საერთაშორისო მნიშვნელობის გზა ს55, Saertashoriso mnishvnelobis gza S5, road of international importance), also known as Tbilisi-Bakurtsikhe-Lagodekhi (Azerbaijan border) or Kakheti Highway, is a "road of international importance" within the Georgian road network and runs from Tbilisi via Sagarejo and Bakurtsikhe to the border with Azerbaijan near Lagodekhi over a distance of . After crossing the Georgian-Azerbaijan border the highway continues as M5 to Zagatala and Yevlakh. The S5 highway is one of the two Georgian S-highways that is not part of the European or Asian international highway routes. Within the Georgian S-network it connects with the S9 Tbilisi Bypass.

Referring to its main location, the Kakheti region, the road is nicknamed "Kakheti Highway". While the segment in the capital region until the Tbilisi Bypass intersection has been built as a 6 lane city express road, and has been so until the airport since the 1970s, the rest of the highway is a 2 lane highway which passes through towns and villages. To improve traffic flow in the crowded Alazani valley, a bypass is planned between Bakurtsikhe and Tsnori, and the  Tbilisi Bypass - Sagarejo section is scheduled to be upgraded to a 2x2 motorway.

Background
Since the early 1980s the current S5 route was referred to within the Soviet road network as A302 between Tbilisi and the junction West of Lagodekhi. Beyond this point the road was part of the A315 to Zagatala and further into the Azerbaijan SSR. Prior to the 1980s the route of today's S5 was unnumbered as was the case with most Soviet roads.

After Georgia regained independence in 1991, the Soviet route designations were maintained until 1996 when the current route numbering system was adopted. In that year the "roads of international importance" (S-)category was introduced and the "S5 Tbilisi-Bakurtsikhe-Lagodekhi (Azerbaijan border)" replaced the old A302 and A315 designations.

Future
In 2021 contractors were signed for a new  motorway section of the S5 highway, between the Tbilisi Bypass (S9) and Sagarejo. The project is divided in three lots and will be financed by the state. The redesigned section will bypass villages and towns.

Also a  km bypass between Bakurtsikhe and Tsnori has been announced. The tender for this section has been completed in 2021. This section of the S5 in the Alazani Valley is densely built up and has a chain of villages and towns. Similarly, the Gurjaani Bypass was opened north of Bakurtikhe in 2021.

Route

The reference point for the mileage of roads leaving Tbilisi, such as the S5 highway, is Freedom Square according to the Georgian "Law on motor roads". But that does not mean Freedom Square is the actual starting point of the highway.

Tbilisi - Sagarejo

The Kakheti Highway starts in George W Bush Street the "Kakheti Highway" as a 2x3 lane city express road, with parallel lanes until the airport exit just before the Tbilisi Lilo area. In 2020 the stretch until the Tbilisi Airport has been completely rehabilitated. Through Lilo the road is a 2x2 lane city road after which the road reduces to a two lane highway until its terminus. From this point a 35 km 2x2 motorway to Sagarejo has been planned, with construction works being anticipated. Heading East the S5 highway runs through the dry East Georgian lands passing a few villages and some hills along the way. Just East of Vaziani the Sh38 state route offers an alternative to north Kakheti and Alazani valley via the  Gombori Pass. Near Sagarejo the highway skirts along the foot of the Gombori mountain range which extends in southeasterly direction from the Caucasus range and separates the Iori and Alazani river valleys. Sagarejo is the regional centre of this part of Kakheti, and it offers the northern access road to the historic David Gareja monastery complex on the border with Azerbaijan.

Sagarejo - Tsnori

Heading out of Sagarejo the S5 follows the foot of the Gombori mountain range. The Tbilisi - Gurjaani - Telavi railway line which opened in 1915 follows more or less the same route, and crosses the S5 a couple of times (grade separated). Just before passing over the Gombori Range in its southern tip the Sh40 leads to touristic Signagi which is situated on top of the ridge providing splendid views over the Alazani Valley. The S5 meanwhile passes over the lower part of the range at a modest  and arrives in Bakurtsikhe. In Bakurtsikhe the S5 turns right running parallel to the Alazani river valley and the flank of the Gombori Range. Left in Bakurtsikhe runs the main thoroughfare of the South side of the Alazani valley, the Sh42 state route to Gurjaani, Telavi and Akhmeta.

Due to the intensive wine production in this region, this side of the Alazani Valley is densely populated with a string of villages and towns crammed next to each other along the Sh42 and S5. Since summer 2021 a new Bypass has been opened between Bakurtsikhe and Gurjaani to improve traffic flow while reducing traffic through the villages. The S5 between Bakurtsikhe and Tsnori will get a similar bypass around the string of villages. For a highway with this status this section of the road is also quite narrow at places.

Tsnori - Lagodekhi

In Tsnori the S5 highway turns northeast across the fertile and green Alazani river valley. The Alazani is the main river in Kakheti and provides the water for the intensive grape and fruit farming in the region. Across the valley the highway passes through a string of villages again, yet less densely populated. At Ninigori the S5 junctions with the regional thoroughfare along the North side of the valley, the Sh43, which leads to Akhmeta via Kvareli. At the foot of the Caucasus Range Lagodekhi is the main town near the border with Azerbaijan. Beyond the border via a narrow bridge across the Matsimis Tskali River the road continues as M-5 through the Zaqatala region, a formerly contested area between the two countries.

Intersections

References

Roads in Georgia (country)